is a 1998 Japanese film directed by Takeshi Miyasaka.

Cast
 Kaori Momoi as Kimie Tadokoro
 Hirotarō Honda as Tsuguo Tadokoro
 Hideo Takamatsu as Osawa Hikojiro
 Yumi Yoshiyuki as Ryōko Sakurazawa
 Tomorowo Taguchi as Michio Hori
 Riki Takeuchi as Momotarō
 Yuko Oshima as a festival girl

Reception

Awards
20th Yokohama Film Festival
 Won: Best Supporting Actress - Yumi Yoshiyuki

References

External links
 
 大怪獣東京に現わる(1998) at allcinema 
 大怪獣東京に現わる at KINENOTE 

Films set in Fukui Prefecture
Films directed by Takeshi Miyasaka
Kaiju films
Shochiku films
1990s Japanese films